The Fort Myers Royals were a minor league affiliate of the Kansas City Royals from 1978 to 1987. In 1978 the Royals were brought to Fort Myers, Florida by the Kansas City franchise. This was because Fort Myers served as the spring training home of the Kansas City Royals.  The Royals were a Single A Florida State League franchise. The team played at Terry Park Ballfield from 1978 until 1987. In 1985 the Royals won the Florida State League Championship. Kevin Seitzer was a member of that Fort Myers Royals team. The Minor League franchise left Fort Myers in 1988 when the Major League Baseball franchise moved Spring Training to Haines City, Florida and Baseball City Stadium.

Season-by-season

Ballpark
The Fort Myers Royals played at Terry Park, located at 3410 Palm Beach Boulevard. Built in 1955, the historic ballpark was placed on the National Register of Historic Places in 1995. It sustained hurricane damage in 2004, that resulted in the grandstands being rebuilt. The ballpark still exists today as part of the Terry Park Sports Complex.

Notable alumni
Numerous Fort Myers Royals alumni reached the major leagues; some of note include:

 Sean Berry (1987)
 Mike Butcher (1987)
 Tom Gordon (1987), MLB All-Star
 Greg Hibbard (1987)
 Ken Kravec (1987)
 Brian McRae (1987)
 Melido Perez (1987)
 Jerry Terrell (1987, MGR)
 Jacob Brumfield (1986)
 Luis de los Santos (1985)
 Kevin Seitzer (1985), 2 x MLB All-Star; 1987 AL hits leader
 Gary Thurman (1985)
 Bret Saberhagen (1983  3×  MLB All-Star; 1985 World Series MVP; 1989 AL ERA leader;  2 × AL Cy Young Award (1985, 1989)
 David Cone (1982), 5 x MLB All-Star; Perfect Game 7/18/1999; 1994 AL Cy Young Award
 Mark Gubicza (1982), 2 x MLB All-Star

 Dennis Leonard (1982, 1985), 1977 AL wins leader
 Bill Pecota (1982–83)
 Butch Davis (1981)
 Tom Candiotti (1980)
 Don Slaught (1980)
 Atlee Hammaker (1979), MLB All-Star; 1983 NL ERA leader
 Pat Sheridan (1979–80)
 Gene Lamont (1978–80, MGR) 1993 AL Manager of the Year
 Renie Martin (1978)
 Darryl Motley (1978–80)

References

Baseball teams established in 1978
Defunct baseball teams in Florida
Defunct Florida State League teams
Baseball in Fort Myers, Florida
Kansas City Royals minor league affiliates
Sports clubs disestablished in 1987
1978 establishments in Florida
1987 disestablishments in Florida
Baseball teams disestablished in 1987